Edward Gardner may refer to: 

 Edward W. Gardner (1867–1932), American balkline and straight rail billiards champion
 Edward Joseph Gardner (1898–1950), U.S. Representative from Ohio
 Ed Gardner (1901–1963), American actor, director and writer
 Edward Gardner (minister) (1907–2006), American minister and civil rights leader with the Alabama Christian Movement for Human Rights
 Edward Gardner (British politician) (1912–2001), British Conservative politician
 Ted Gardner, Australian businessman
 Edward Gardner (conductor) (born 1974), British conductor

See also
Edward Gardner House, building